Jackie & Ryan (released in the UK and South Africa as Love Me Like You Do) is a 2014 American romantic drama film written and directed by Ami Canaan Mann, starring Katherine Heigl and Ben Barnes.
The film was released on July 3, 2015 in a limited release and through video on demand by Entertainment One in the United States.

Plot

Set in Ogden, Utah, the film is about two 20-something musicians whose paths briefly intersect, Ryan (Ben Barnes), a modern-day, nomadic train hopper struggling to be a successful bluegrass musician, and Jackie (Katherine Heigl), a recently single mom, battling to get custody of her daughter. They have a symbiotic relationship which briefly becomes passionate and changes both of their lives.
 
Jackie is a once-known musician who now lives on little money in her mother’s home in her hometown, and regularly has nasty phone altercations about her daughter Lia (Emily Alyn Lind) with her almost ex-husband. Walking downtown one day, she observes Ryan busking with a folk tune. Recognizing his talent, she tells him so. Also noticing he only does covers, she asks, “Ain’t got nothin’ to say?”  
 
A short time later Jackie is knocked down by a slow-moving truck and he helps her up that they actually connect. Not having health insurance makes her especially grateful.  Through his charm and handy-man skills, Ryan stays a few days with Jackie at her mother’s (Sheryl Lee). In a short time, they find inspiration in each other: Jackie pushes Ryan to write his own songs, while he motivates her to stand up to her husband.

At this point Jackie & Ryan explore their romantic connection. In the performance scenes, Heigl is actually singing, and Barnes is actually signing and playing guitar. They go to a fest dedicated to folk music fiddlers. The music is not hippy, nor does it make you dance. It’s old-fashioned, deeply melancholic, and satisfying.

They part ways to follow their quests: Jackie goes to NYC to sell her condo, and briefly faces her ex. Ryan finally gets to the recording studio and records some of his original songs.

Cast 
 Katherine Heigl as Jackie
 Ben Barnes as Ryan
 Clea DuVall as Virginia
 Sheryl Lee as Miriam 
 Emily Alyn Lind as Lia
 Ryan Bingham as Cowboy's Brother

Production 
Filming took place in Utah in 2014. The film was shot in 20 days.

Release 
Jackie & Ryan screened in the Horizons section at the 71st Venice International Film Festival on August 30, 2014. The film then screened at the Newport Beach International Film Festival on April 25, 2015.

Reception 
Jackie & Ryan received mixed reviews. On review aggregator Rotten Tomatoes, critics gave the film a rating of 64%, based on 22 reviews, with a weighted average of 5.42/10. On Metacritic, the film has a score of 55%, based on 15 reviews. Jessica Kiang of Indiewire gave the film a "C" rating, calling it "a strangely old-fashioned film, yielding a big enough crop of corn to revive the entire Midwestern economy, putting forth a dubiously romanticized view of the philosophical beauty of the train-hopping lifestyle". Lee Marshall of Screen International in his favorable review commented that it is "a women's film in which the sensitively-conveyed bond between three female generations of one family seem destined to be much stronger than any ties with the men who drift in and out of sight".

References

External links 
 
 Jackie & Ryan at Box Office Mojo
 
 
 , review by Daniel Gelb (3/5)

2014 films
2014 romantic drama films
American independent films
American romantic drama films
Entertainment One films
Films about music and musicians
Films directed by Ami Canaan Mann
Films set in Utah
Films shot in Utah
2014 independent films
2010s English-language films
2010s American films
English-language romantic drama films